Luigi Dinielli (born 6 October 1996) is an Italian football player. He plays for Fidelis Andria.

Club career
He made his Serie C debut for Foggia on 29 December 2016 in a game against Siracusa.

References

External links
 
 

1996 births
Footballers from Bari
Living people
Italian footballers
Calcio Foggia 1920 players
Paganese Calcio 1926 players
Serie C players
Serie D players
Association football defenders